Alan Brian Levine (born May 22, 1968) is an American former Major League Baseball relief pitcher who pitched 234 games in the minor leagues, and 416 games in the major leagues.

Early life & career

Levine, who is Jewish, was born in Park Ridge, Illinois, and graduated from Hoffman Estates High School, attended and played for Harper Junior College, and graduated from Southern Illinois University. In , Levine walked onto the SIU team as a pitcher.

Baseball career

The Chicago White Sox drafted him in the 11th round of the 1991 draft.

Minor leagues

In 1991 he debuted with the Class A Utica Blue Sox, and was 5th in the New York-Penn League with two complete games. In 1992, he stuck 142 batters between the Sarasota White Sox and the single-A South Bend White Sox, tying for second among White Sox minor leaguers. In 1993, he led Florida State League pitchers with 129 strikeouts while pitching for Sarasota, and came in third in the league with three complete games, and fifth with 11 wins. Levine played AA for the Birmingham Barons in 1994, along with Michael Jordan, until he was called up to AAA mid-season, and came in eighth in with a 3.31 ERA.

In 1995, he started in the Nashville Sounds' starting rotation, but spent most of the season in double-A Birmingham, where he was second on the team with seven saves.

Levine pitched 234 games in the minor leagues, over 11 seasons.

Major leagues

In , he held batters to a .125 batting average when there were two outs with runners in scoring position. In December 1997, he was traded by the White Sox with Larry Thomas to the Texas Rangers for Benji Gil.

In April , he was selected off waivers by the Anaheim Angels from the Texas Rangers. In , he held batters to a .186 batting average when there were two outs with runners in scoring position. In , he had perhaps his best season. He had a 2.38 ERA (2.11 in relief; second-best among all AL relievers) for the Angels in 64 games, and his eight wins were third-most among all AL relief pitchers. In , he held batters to a .206 batting average when there were two outs with runners in scoring position.

In January , Levine signed as a free agent with the St. Louis Cardinals, but was released in March. In April, he signed as a free agent with the Tampa Bay Devil Rays, who then sold him to the Kansas City Royals on July 31. In 2003, he had another excellent season, splitting it between the Tampa Bay Devil Rays and the Kansas City Royals. He had a 2.79 ERA in 54 games. He held batters to a .189 batting average when there were two outs with runners in scoring position. In December 2003, he signed as a free agent with the Detroit Tigers. In , he held batters to a .154 batting average when there were two outs with runners in scoring position.

For seven seasons in a row, from 1999–2004, he pitched in at least 50 games each year.

In February , he signed as a free agent with the San Francisco Giants, who released him in June. On July 7, 2005, he was signed as a free agent by the Florida Marlins, but was released a week later without pitching a game for them.

Levine played for seven major league teams. For his career, he held batters to a .220 batting average when there were runners in scoring position with two outs.

Atlantic League
In 2008, Levine pitched for the Newark Bears of the Atlantic League of Professional Baseball.

Personal life
Levine later lived in Belleville, Illinois.

See also
List of select Jewish baseball players

References

External links

Retrosheet
Venezuelan Professional Baseball League statistics
Adam Levine explains his comment on The Voice
Jews in Sports biography

1968 births
Anaheim Angels players
Baseball players from Illinois
Birmingham Barons players
Caribes de Oriente players
American expatriate baseball players in Venezuela
Chicago White Sox players
Detroit Tigers players
Erie SeaWolves players
Fresno Grizzlies players
Jewish American baseball players
Jewish Major League Baseball players
Kansas City Royals players
Living people
Major League Baseball pitchers
Nashville Sounds players
Newark Bears players
Oklahoma RedHawks players
People from Hoffman Estates, Illinois
Sportspeople from Park Ridge, Illinois
Salt Lake Stingers players
San Francisco Giants players
Sarasota White Sox players
South Bend White Sox players
Southern Illinois Salukis baseball players
Tampa Bay Devil Rays players
Texas Rangers players
Utica Blue Sox players
Harper Hawks baseball players
Hoffman Estates High School alumni
21st-century American Jews